Westley Paul Cox (born December 15, 1986) is an American politician. He is a former member of the South Carolina House of Representatives from the 10th District, who served from 2018 to 2022. He is a member of the Republican Party.

Political career 
Cox is a member of the Medical, Military, Public and Municipal Affairs Committee and the Operations and Management Committee.

Electoral history

2018 SC House of Representatives
Cox was the only Republican to run in 2018, so there was no Republican primary.

Personal life
Cox was born in West Pelzer and currently resides in Piedmont. He graduated from Clemson University in 2008 with a Bachelor of Arts degree and received his J.D. from the University of South Carolina in 2014. He was admitted to the South Carolina Bar in November 2014. He is married to Caroline Alex, with whom he has one child. Cox is an attorney.

References

Living people
1986 births
Democratic Party members of the South Carolina House of Representatives
21st-century American politicians
Clemson University alumni
University of South Carolina alumni